First Lady of Guatemala is the title held by the wife of the president of Guatemala or designee. The position of Guatemalan first lady has been vacant since january 2020 because Alejandro Giammattei is divorced.

First ladies of Guatemala

See also
Presidents of Guatemala

Notes

References

First ladies
Guatemala
Lists of Guatemalan people